Najafi is a surname originating from Najaf, Iraq. Notable people with the surname include:

 Abolhassan Najafi, Iranian writer
 Ahmad Najafi, Iranian actor
 Ayatollah Sheikh Basheer Hussain Najafi, Iraqi grand ayatollah
 Bagher Najafi, Iranian scholar
 Grand Ayatollah Muhammad Hussain Najafi, Pakistani grand ayatollah
 Hafiz Riaz Hussain Najafi, Pakistani educator
 Mohammad-Ali Najafi, Iranian politician
 Sina Najafi, American magazine editor
 Shahin Najafi, Iranian musician
 Syed Safdar Hussain Najafi, Pakistani scholar
Dr Najafi Zehra Zainul Raza, Indian Dental Surgeon

Iranian-language surnames
Persian-language surnames
Arabic-language surnames
Shi'ite surnames
Pouran D. Najafi-Faghri, American Professor 
ar:النجفي
de:Najafi